Warren Earl Davidson (born March 1, 1970) is an American politician and former military officer serving as the U.S. representative for Ohio's 8th congressional district since 2016. The district, which was once represented by House Speaker John Boehner, includes a swath of suburban and exurban territory between Cincinnati and Dayton. Before entering politics, he was an officer in United States Army special operations and led his family's manufacturing business. Davidson is a member of the Republican Party.

Personal life
Davidson was born and raised in Sidney, Ohio, graduating from Sidney High School in 1988.

Davidson met his wife, Lisa, in 1991 while he was entering West Point and she was serving as a missionary setting up Backyard Bible Clubs for Ohio churches. They married in 1995 and have two children. They reside in Troy, a suburb of Dayton.

Military career

Assignments 
Davidson enlisted in the Army after graduating from high school in 1988. After training, he was stationed in Germany with the 3rd Infantry Division, and witnessed the fall of the Berlin Wall. Soon thereafter he attended the United States Military Academy, graduating in 1995. He left with an officers' commission and a degree in American history, minoring in mechanical engineering. After West Point, he went to Army Ranger School and ROP indoctrination in 1996, subsequently spending time in the elite 75th Ranger Regiment, 101st Airborne Division and The Old Guard. He separated honorably from the Army in 2000.

Davidson returned to serve in a new capacity at his alma mater when he was appointed to the 2020 United States Military Academy Board of Visitors.

Awards and decorations 

 Expert Infantryman Badge
 Army Ranger Tab

Post-military career 
Upon separation from the Army, Davidson attended the University of Notre Dame for his MBA. After graduate school, he returned to Ohio to help his father run the family business, West Troy Tool & Machine. Davidson purchased the business from his father in 2005 and transformed it from a small batch machining and fabricating business into a high-volume contract fabrication and injection molding manufacturer. In 2014 Davidson and a business partner combined West Troy with another manufacturing group, RK Metals, with Davidson becoming managing director of RK Metals and president of West Troy. They renamed the combined business Integral Manufacturing in 2015. Davidson ceased affiliation with the company upon taking office in 2016, but continues to percentage lease facilities to Integral and a neighboring company.

During his time in manufacturing, Davidson served as chairman of the Dayton Region Manufacturers Association, an industry trade group. From 2004 to 2005, he served on the Concord Township, Ohio, Board of Trustees.

U.S House of Representatives

Elections

2016 special 

After Representative John Boehner resigned from the U.S. House of Representatives, Davidson ran in a special election for the balance of Boehner’s 13th term, recruited heavily by fellow Ohio Congressman Jim Jordan. Davidson won the 15-way primary, all but guaranteeing his victory in the heavily Republican district's special election on June 7. He was sworn in on June 9.

2016 general 

Davidson defeated Democratic nominee Steven Fought for a full term, 68.7% to 27.0%.

2018 

Davidson defeated Democratic nominee Vanessa Enoch, 66.6% to 33.4%.

2020 

Davidson defeated Enoch again with 69% of the vote.

Tenure
Upon election, Davidson was immediately asked to join the House Freedom Caucus, an invitation he accepted from the group, which was instrumental in pushing Boehner to resign.

Davidson is a member of the budget and spending task force on the Republican Study Committee.

In July 2020, Davidson founded the Sound Money Caucus, a caucus focused on maintaining financial stability and Dollar hegemony. He serves as its chair.

In 2019, Davidson made an unsuccessful bid for chair of the caucus after Representative Mark Meadows vacated the position, ultimately withdrawing in favor of Andy Biggs. Davidson has served as the caucus's policy chair since October 2019.

On January 7, 2021, Davidson objected to the certification of electors in the 2020 US presidential election, alleging widespread voter fraud. 

In January 2022, Davidson faced backlash from Jewish groups after comparing a Washington, D.C. city ordinance requiring display of photo identification and proof of COVID-19 vaccination to enter businesses to the Holocaust.

Committee assignments 
United States House Committee on Financial Services
Subcommittee on Monetary Policy and Trade
Subcommittee on Capital Markets, Securities, and Investment

Caucus memberships 

Freedom Caucus
Sound Money Caucus
Republican Study Committee
Army Caucus
Blockchain Caucus
Liberty Caucus
Second Amendment Caucus
Steel Caucus
Values Action Team
 Warrior Caucus

Political positions

Abortion 
Davidson is staunchly anti-abortion except to save the mother's life. On August 12, 2020, he and Senator Mike Braun co-wrote a letter to Treasury Secretary Steve Mnuchin urging him to direct the IRS not to treat premiums for health insurance that covers abortions as medical care, writing, "in all but the most extreme circumstances, abortion is an elective procedure."

On June 26, 2022, when asked by Pamela Brown on CNN Newsroom whether he was okay with a child rape victim carrying out a pregnancy, he said, "It’s a compromise. Like I say, rape is raised as an objection and the Heartbeat Bill already deals with that and it’s hard to conceive of somebody who doesn’t know they were raped for two months."

U.S. Capitol Police 
In June 2021, Davidson was one of 21 House Republicans to vote against a resolution to give the Congressional Gold Medal to police officers who defended the U.S. Capitol on January 6.

Cryptocurrencies 
Davidson has proposed the Token Taxonomy Act in each of the last several sessions. The bill is designed to normalize cryptocurrencies into the US financial system, and provides for a nontaxable profit margin of $600 annually for cryptocurrency holdings, designed to incentivize use of the currencies by eliminating any tax burden on small value changes. The bill also specifies that token-based financial systems are not securities.

Economic policy 
Davidson cites his manufacturing business experience as guiding his economic policy principles. He is a strong believer in full expensing as a tax incentive stimulus, on the grounds that it would allow businesses to immediately deduct the cost of any capital asset such as long-term investments like buildings, machinery, or tooling from their corporate tax bills.

Foreign policy and the military 
Davidson has objected to America's overseas military presence and the continued wars in Iraq and Afghanistan on numerous occasions. He favors ending the Authorization for the Use of Military Force Against Iraq, which he has called "horribly outdated, inadequate for today's War on Terror, and stretched to the point of absurdity...used to support ongoing missions...against enemies, organizations, and nations with little or no connection to 9/11."

Davidson and Jim Jordan were the only members of Ohio's congressional delegation and two of 60 members of Congress to vote against a bipartisan resolution condemning President Donald Trump's unilateral withdrawal of U.S. military forces from Syria, which passed the House 354–60 in October 2019. Davidson justified the position in an op-ed that called for an outright rejection of neoconservative foreign policy, in which he wrote, "the neoconservative consensus has left America less free, less safe, and burdened by unprecedented debt." He also urged NATO to stipulate that any actions Turkey took against groups like the Kurds in response to U.S. withdrawal should be treated as genocide and be grounds for removal as a treaty signatory.

Davidson voted against the National Defense Authorization Act for Fiscal Year 2021, citing, among other things, "funding for military activity in Afghanistan with no change in strategy or plan to withdraw troops".

In June 2021, Davidson was one of 49 House Republicans to vote to repeal the AUMF against Iraq.

Health care 
Davidson supports Republican efforts to repeal and replace the Affordable Care Act. He has introduced his own legislation, The Patient Fairness Act, aimed at expanding coverage via Health Savings Accounts (HSAs). It would expand availability of these tax-advantaged, investable financial vehicles to a much larger swath of the population than the current propensity for only high-deductible insurance plans to offer such a program. Davidson said he wanted to more than double the maximum investable allowance for the accounts, claiming that will build price transparency for insured patients, develop parity with employer-sponsored healthcare, and offer a vehicle to build intergenerational wealth by making them inheritable assets.

Intelligence and surveillance activities 
Davidson supports curtailing many of the broad signals intelligence permissions granted in the wake of the September 11 attacks, which he has called an "extralegal spying regime" of "vague laws and lax protections". He has worked to orchestrate several major attempts to reform the laws in recent years.

The first major attempt at reform came in January 2020 when Davidson co-sponsored H.R. 5675, The Safeguarding Americans' Private Records Act (SAPRA) alongside the notably unusual coalition of Progressive Caucus Democrats like Pramila Jayapal and Freedom Caucus Republicans like Matt Gaetz. The bill aimed at significant reforms, including new transparency of FISA Court decisions and ensuring 4th amendment constraints on "tangible things" requests subsequent to the decision in Carpenter v. United States. Efforts stalled after House Judiciary Committee Chairman Jerry Nadler canceled markup on the bill at the request of House Intelligence Committee Chairman Adam Schiff.

Another came during debate over reauthorization of the Foreign Intelligence Surveillance Act (FISA), when Davidson worked with Representative Zoe Lofgren to introduce the Lofgren-Davidson Amendment. The amendment was to serve as an outright prohibition on warrantless search of American's internet activities by the Intelligence Community via Section 215 of FISA empowered by the USA FREEDOM Act (aka the Library Records provision). Reauthorization of the soon-to-expire Section 215 concerned a set of provisions known informally as the “business records” power, the “call detail records” authority, the “roving wiretaps” provision, and the never-used “lone wolf” amendment. Among other reforms, the new language would have constrained these powers by creating an affirmative burden on the government to be absolutely sure the target in question is not a U.S. person before obtaining internet records, and make unlawful the incidental collection of U.S. persons' data via selection of all web traffic data for a particular video, search query, or webpage. In addition, if an order could result in a U.S. person's data, it would be unlawful without a warrant narrowly tailored to a specific subject. It also included a provision to eliminate the lone wolf amendment. The proposal mirrored a companion Senate amendment by Senators Ron Wyden and Steve Daines, which had narrowly failed in the Senate. Davidson said he would support reauthorization of FISA so long as the amendment was included.

After House Intelligence Committee chair Adam Schiff made a statement to the New York Times suggesting that the Lofgren-Davidson amendment would not completely eliminate warrantless surveillance, Davidson and Wyden quickly abandoned support of the amendment over fears that the agreement reached between Lofgren and Schiff over the weekend had betrayed much of the intent of the amendment with omissions and loopholes to be interpreted maliciously by the secretive FISA Court. Both went on to oppose the amendment and underlying reauthorization bill, with Davidson saying, "this is Representative Schiff and intelligence hawks working overtime to protect the surveillance state status quo." The entire bill was later pulled by Speaker Pelosi after Trump indicated he would veto and moderate Republicans indicated opposition. Barring further action Section 215 powers lie dormant, as authority expired March 15, 2020.

After Attorney General William Barr tried to suggest that FISA could be reauthorized with assurances the Justice Department would fix abuses through administrative rulemaking, Davidson pushed back against suggestions that any agency decisions could stand in for crucial legislative reform.

Davidson cited compromises of "Americans’ privacy in the name of fighting terror" as a reason for his vote against the National Defense Authorization Act for Fiscal Year 2021.

Welfare 
Davidson favors welfare reform. He has argued that the political sensitivity of being the first mover to modify any social safety net has a dissuasive effect on reform efforts. To combat this, he has proposed what he calls "welfare BRAC" (an allusion to the bipartisan Base Realignment And Closure panels that consolidated and reformed US military installations), suggesting a panel of four Republicans and four Democrats to evaluate each welfare program's effectiveness and recommend changes, cuts, or consolidation of the 92 federal programs.

Immigration 
Davidson voted against the Fairness for High-Skilled Immigrants Act of 2019, which would amend the Immigration and Nationality Act to eliminate the per-country numerical limitation for employment-based immigrants, to increase the per-country numerical limitation for family-sponsored immigrants, and for other purposes.

Davidson voted against the Further Consolidated Appropriations Act of 2020, which authorized DHS to nearly double the available H-2B visas for the remainder of FY 2020.

Davidson voted against the Consolidated Appropriations Act (H.R. 1158), which effectively prohibits Immigration and Customs Enforcement from cooperating with the Department of Health and Human Services to detain or remove illegal alien sponsors of Unaccompanied Alien Children.

Electoral history

References

External links
 Congressman Warren Davidson official U.S. House website
 Congressional campaign website
 
 
 

|-

1970 births
21st-century American politicians
Living people
People from Sidney, Ohio
People from Troy, Ohio
United States Army officers
United States Military Academy alumni
Mendoza College of Business alumni
Republican Party members of the United States House of Representatives from Ohio